John Lawrence Caldwell (July 16, 1875 - December 6, 1922) was the United States Ambassador to Iran from 1914 to 1921.

Biography
He was born in Bourbon County, Kansas on July 16, 1875 to Thomas Anderson Caldwell and Mary Alice Hamman. He married, June 11, 1902, to Evelyne de Lambert. He worked as a school teacher and later a lawyer. He was a member of the Kansas State Senate for the 8th District, from 1901 to 1904. He was the Bourbon County Prosecuting Attorney from 1907 to 1911. He was a candidate for U.S. Representative from Kansas 2nd District, 1910; delegate to Democratic National Convention from Kansas, 1912; U.S. Minister to Persia, 1914 to 1921. He died on December 6, 1922.

References

1875 births
1922 deaths
Ambassadors of the United States to Iran
People from Bourbon County, Kansas
Kansas lawyers
Democratic Party Kansas state senators
19th-century American lawyers
20th-century American diplomats